The 2016 season was BEC Tero Sasana's 20th season in the Thai League T1.

Players

First team squad

Out on loan

Thai Premier League
Toyota Thai Premier League

Thai League Cup
Toyota League Cup

References

External links 

Aru
Police Tero F.C. seasons